My American Cousin is a Canadian drama film, released in 1985. Written and directed by Sandy Wilson based on her own childhood, the film stars Margaret Langrick as Sandy Wilcox, a preteen girl growing up on a ranch in rural Penticton, British Columbia in the late 1950s.  Sandy's longing to be treated as an adult is roused even further when her older American cousin Butch Walker (John Wildman) comes for a visit. The cast also includes Richard Donat, Jane Mortifee, Babz Chula and Camille Henderson.

A 2006 On Screen! documentary about the film featured interviews with director Sandy Wilson and leading actress Margaret Langrick.

The sequel to this film, American Boyfriends, was released in 1989.

Awards
My American Cousin won six awards at the 7th Genie Awards, including Best Picture, Best Director (Wilson), Best Original Screenplay (Wilson), Best Actor (Wildman), Best Actress (Langrick) and Best Film Editing (Haida Paul).

The film was also nominated for Best Supporting Actor (Donat), Best Sound, Best Sound Editing, Best Art Direction and Best Costume Design, but did not win those awards.

External links
 

1985 films
English-language Canadian films
Best Picture Genie and Canadian Screen Award winners
1980s coming-of-age drama films
Canadian coming-of-age drama films
Films set in British Columbia
1980s biographical drama films
Canadian biographical drama films
Films about Canada–United States relations
American Playhouse
1985 drama films
Films directed by Sandy Wilson
Films shot in British Columbia
1980s English-language films
1980s Canadian films